Randolph County is a county located in the southwestern portion of the US state of Georgia and is considered part of the Black Belt, historically an area of plantations. As of the 2020 census, the population was 6,425, roughly one-third of its peak population in 1910, when there were numerous agricultural workers. The county seat is Cuthbert.

History
Randolph County was created on December 20, 1828, and named after the Virginia planter and politician John Randolph.

He was honored originally as the namesake of present-day Jasper County but, because of his opposition to U.S. entry into the War of 1812, the Georgia General Assembly changed the county name on December 10, 1812. Eventually, John Randolph's reputation was restored. In 1828, the General Assembly organized the current Randolph County in the west of the state. Most of the historic tribe of Muscogee people (Creek) were forced from the area to Indian Territory during Indian Removal.

Lumpkin, Georgia was the original county seat. It was within the portion of Randolph County that was reassigned in 1830 to form Stewart County, and Lumpkin was designated as the latter's county seat.

This area is considered part of the Black Belt, upland areas across the Deep South that were developed in the 19th century as plantations after invention of the cotton gin made processing of short-staple cotton profitable. Enslaved Blacks made up the vast majority of workers on the plantations, with hundreds of thousands being transported through the domestic slave trade from the coast and Upper South. After the American Civil War, many freedmen and their descendants continued to work on plantations in the county and region, comprising the majority of county population until the 1930s.

Like other areas of the rural South, workers in Randolph County lost jobs due to mechanization, invasion of the boll weevil, and the decline in agriculture. In the 20th century, many black families moved from the county to cities in the North and Midwest for work and less oppressive conditions during the Great Migration. However, the rural counties of the Black Belt continue to have substantial African-American populations. Agriculture has been industrialized and depends on relatively few workers.

By mid April 2020 Randolph County (including nearby Albany) hosted the third highest density of COVID-19 outbreaks in the nation, and as of May 2020, next to the New York Metro Area, and Boston, Massachusetts and metro area.  Health department records showed an infection rate of 1.9 for every 100 citizens in Randolph County. The Randolph county outbreak was largely composed of an outbreak in a nursing home and may have had connections to the Procter & Gamble toilet paper factory in Albany, Georgia, which was deemed an essential service.

Geography

More than half of Randolph County, roughly east of U.S. Route 27, is located in the Ichawaynochaway Creek sub-basin of the ACF River Basin (Apalachicola-Chattahoochee-Flint River Basin). The northwestern portion of the county, from just south of Cuthbert north, is located in the Middle Chattahoochee River-Walter F. George Lake sub-basin of the same ACF River Basin.  The southwestern corner, centered on Coleman, is located in the Lower Chattahoochee River sub-basin of the same larger ACF River Basin.

Major highways

  U.S. Route 27
  U.S. Route 27 Business
  U.S. Highway 82
  State Route 1
  State Route 1 Business
  State Route 41
  State Route 50
  State Route 216
  State Route 266

Adjacent counties
 Stewart County – north
 Webster County – northeast
 Terrell County – east
 Calhoun County – southeast
 Clay County – southwest
 Quitman County – west

Demographics

2020 census

As of the 2020 United States census, there were 6,425 people, 2,553 households, and 1,611 families residing in the county.

2010 census
As of the 2010 United States Census, there were 7,719 people, 3,187 households, and 2,011 families living in the county. The racial makeup of the county was 61.8% black or African American, 36.6% white, 0.3% Asian, 0.1% American Indian, 0.5% from other races, and 0.8% from two or more races. Those of Hispanic or Latino origin made up 1.5% of the population. In terms of European-American ancestry, 11.7% identified as English, 8.1% were Irish, and 2.4% were American.

Of the 3,187 households, 29.3% had children under the age of 18 living with them, 36.0% were married couples living together, 22.7% had a female householder with no husband present, 36.9% were non-families, and 33.5% of all households were made up of individuals. The average household size was 2.33 and the average family size was 2.97. The median age was 42.8 years.

The median income for a household in the county was $26,194 and the median income for a family was $29,800. Males had a median income of $21,313 versus $23,542 for females. The per capita income for the county was $17,632. About 23.7% of families and 28.0% of the population were below the poverty line, including 53.2% of those under age 18 and 16.3% of those age 65 or over.

2000 census
As of the census of 2000, there were 7,791 people, 2,909 households, and 1,972 families living in the county.  The population density was 18 people per square mile (7/km2).  There were 3,402 housing units at an average density of 8 per square mile (3/km2).  The racial makeup of the county was 59.47% Black or African American, 38.94% White, 0.35% Native American, 0.18% Asian, 0.12% Pacific Islander, 0.51% from other races, and 0.44% from two or more races.  1.18% of the population were Hispanic or Latino of any race.

There were 2,909 households, out of which 30.30% had children under the age of 18 living with them, 40.90% were married couples living together, 22.60% had a female householder with no husband present, and 32.20% were non-families. 30.00% of all households were made up of individuals, and 14.80% had someone living alone who was 65 years of age or older.  The average household size was 2.57 and the average family size was 3.20.

In the county, the population was spread out, with 27.30% under the age of 18, 11.00% from 18 to 24, 24.20% from 25 to 44, 21.90% from 45 to 64, and 15.60% who were 65 years of age or older.  The median age was 36 years. For every 100 females there were 85.90 males.  For every 100 females age 18 and over, there were 78.10 males.

The median income for a household in the county was $22,004, and the median income for a family was $30,278. Males had a median income of $27,033 versus $20,394 for females. The per capita income for the county was $11,809.  About 22.00% of families and 27.70% of the population were below the poverty line, including 36.20% of those under age 18 and 31.00% of those age 65 or over.

Communities

Cities
 Cuthbert
 Shellman

Census-designated place
 Coleman

Other unincorporated communities
 Benevolence
 Carnegie
 Springvale

Politics

See also

 National Register of Historic Places listings in Randolph County, Georgia
List of counties in Georgia

References

External links

 Randolph County Sheriff's Office

 
1828 establishments in Georgia (U.S. state)
Populated places established in 1828
Black Belt (U.S. region)
Georgia (U.S. state) counties
Majority-minority counties in Georgia